Gelian (also Romanized as Gelīān) is a village in Valupey Rural District, in the Central District of Savadkuh County, Mazandaran Province, Iran. At the 2006 census, its population was 41, in 15 families.

References 

Populated places in Savadkuh County